Velachery taluk is a taluk of the city district of Chennai in the Indian state of Tamil Nadu. It was formed in December 2013 from parts of the erstwhile Mambalam-Guindy and Mylapore-Triplicane taluks. It comprises the neighbourhoods of Besant Nagar, Tharamani, Thiruvanmiyur and Velachery.

References

General
 Taluks of Chennai district

Specific

Taluks of Chennai district